The R.T. Barnett and Company Building is a historic two-story building in Bozeman, Montana. It was designed in the Victorian Eclectic style with Gothic Revival and Byzantine Revival features by architects Byron Vreeland and Herman Kemna, and built in 1889–1890 for Robert Barnett, the owner of the Northern Pacific Hotel. It has been listed on the National Register of Historic Places since December 1, 1980.

References

Byzantine Revival architecture in the United States
Commercial buildings completed in 1890
Gothic Revival architecture in Montana
National Register of Historic Places in Gallatin County, Montana
1890 establishments in Montana
Commercial buildings on the National Register of Historic Places in Montana
Buildings and structures in Bozeman, Montana